The Bacolod City Arena was a proposed multipurpose indoor arena in Bacolod, Philippines.

History

Development
The local government intended the venue to be one of the venues for the 2019 FIBA World Cup if the Philippines' bid was successful. Though the venue wasn't among the four proposed venues presented to FIBA during the final bid presentation.

However the Philippines lost its bid to China's for the 2019 FIBA World Cup hosting. It was planned if the Philippines' bid was successful, the Bacolod City Arena's construction was to commence in 2016 or 2017.

(BREDCO). The parcel of land was worth P600 million. The city government plans to construct the arena in the acquired reclaimed land through public-private partnership. By August 2015, a businessman has pledged to build the arena on the city's property.

The project was however mothballed after the defeat of then-Mayor Monico Puentevella. Incumbent Mayor Evelio Leonardia rather allocated a separate structure of the same kind to be known as the Bacolod Masskara Coliseum in Barangay Alijis instead. As of 2022, the coliseum is already is under construction.

References

Indoor arenas in the Philippines
Buildings and structures in Bacolod
Basketball venues in the Philippines
Proposed buildings and structures in the Philippines
Sports in Negros Occidental